Isilda Maria de Jesus Veloso Gonçalves (born 11 November 1969) is a retired female race walker from Portugal.

Achievements

References

sports-reference

1969 births
Living people
Portuguese female racewalkers
Athletes (track and field) at the 1992 Summer Olympics
Olympic athletes of Spain
People from Barcelona